The 2015 Chiltern District Council election took place on 7 May 2015 to elect members to all seats of the Chiltern District Council in England, as part of the United Kingdom's local elections that year.

Results

Party Strength
As of 23 March 2018, the council's composition was as follows:

By-elections 
The single-member Ridgeway ward was vacated at the death of long-standing independent Councillor Derek Lacey. The consequent by-election on 22 March 2018 was won by Conservative candidate Nick Southworth.

References

2015 English local elections
May 2015 events in the United Kingdom
2015
2010s in Buckinghamshire